Wok racing is a sport developed by the German TV host and entertainer Stefan Raab in which modified woks are used to make timed runs down an Olympic bobsleigh track.

History 
Wok racing was inspired by a bet in the German TV show Wetten, dass..?. In November 2003, the First official Wok World Championship was broadcast from Winterberg. The immediate success led to the second world championship in Innsbruck on March 4, 2004. Participants are mostly b-list celebrities like musical artists, actors, and TV hosts, but there are also known athletes that have ongoing professional careers in winter sports, like three-time Olympic luge champion Georg Hackl and the Jamaican Bobsled Team.
The third championship took place again in Winterberg on March 5, 2005. In contrast to the previous championships, there were two runs in which all contesters participated. The times of both runs were added. As a further innovation a qualifying round was created in which the participants had to jump from a trickski-jump with woks to determine the starting order. Further the sport event was professionalized.

Equipment

The typical racing woks are the ordinary round-bottomed Chinese pans, usually directly imported from China. The only modifications are that the bottom is reinforced with an epoxy filling and the edges of the wok are coated with polyurethane foam to avoid injuries. Four-person woksleds consist of two pairs of woks, each of them is held together by a rounded frame. The two pairs are connected by a coupling. Due to the rather risky nature of the sport the participants wear heavy protective gear, usually similar to ice hockey equipment. To further reduce friction and the risk of injuries, the athletes wear ladles under their feet.

To improve performance, the undersides of the woks are often heated with a blowlamp before the race.

Advertising controversy
Public wok racing is only practiced once a year at The "World Wok Racing Championships" (German: Wok-WM, lit. Wok Worldcup) which is aired as special edition of Raab's show TV total on the German television channel ProSieben. The network used to declare these broadcasts as sporting events. Under German law that allowed the network to treat the massive corporate sponsorship of the event as incidental advertising which didn't count against Germany's strict rules regarding time limits for TV commercials. After a Berlin court ruling in 2009, however, the shows have to be labeled as an infomercial, since – unlike a regular sporting event – the races are explicitly staged for the TV broadcast, and there is strong evidence that the profits of the event sponsorship directly benefit the network.

World Wok Racing Championships

Venues
  November 6, 2003: Winterberg
  March 4, 2004: Innsbruck
  March 5, 2005: Winterberg
  March 11, 2006: Innsbruck
  March 9, 2007: Innsbruck
  March 8, 2008: Altenberg
  March 7, 2009: Winterberg
  March 19, 2010: Oberhof
  March 12, 2011: Innsbruck
  March 10, 2012: Königssee
  March 2, 2013: Oberhof
  March 8, 2014: Königssee
  March 14, 2015: Innsbruck
  November 12, 2022: Winterberg

Ranking

One-person Wok

Four-person Wok

Records

Speed records

Course Records

See also
 Idiotarod
 Kinetic sculpture race
 Portland Urban Iditarod
 Shopping cart race
 Wife carrying
 Zoobomb

References

 
 

Racing vehicles
Racing
Sledding
Winter sports
Team sports
Human-powered vehicles
Sports originating in Germany
German inventions
Games and sports introduced in 2003
2003 establishments in Germany